The BL 14-inch Mk VII naval gun was a breech loading (BL) gun designed for the battleships of the Royal Navy in the late 1930s. This gun armed the  battleships during the Second World War.

Background
The choice of calibre was limited by the Second London Naval Treaty, an extension of the Washington Naval Treaty which set limits on the size, armament, and number of battleships constructed by the major powers. After disappointing experiences with the combination of high velocity but relatively light shell in the BL 16 inch /45 naval gun of the s, the British reverted to the combination of lower velocities and (relatively) heavier shells in this weapon.

Design

Gun
The built-up gun was of an all-steel construction, using a radial expansion design; this was an advance on earlier British heavy guns, which employed a wire-wound technology. The resulting gun was lighter, less prone to droop, more accurate and had a significantly longer barrel life. The estimated barrel life was 340 effective full charges. Length of bore: 630 inches (45 calibres long). Weight of gun (without breech or counterbalance: 77 tons 14 cwt 84 lbs. Weight of gun with counterbalance: 89 tons 2 cwt 84 lbs. Weight of breech mechanism: 1 ton 17 cwt. Rifling: polygroove, 72 grooves plain section, uniform right-hand twist of 1 turn in 30 calibres. The standard propellant charge:  of cordite.

Mounting

The choice of mounting was a mechanically complex quadruple turret (each battleship had two quadruple turrets (Mark III) and one twin turret (Mark II)). Although the class of battleships was initially designed with three quadruple turrets, it proved impossible to include this amount of firepower and the desired level of protection without exceeding the 35,000 ton displacement treaty limit, furthermore the weight of the superimposed quadruple "B" turret brought the stability of the vessel into question, hence the "B" turret was changed to a smaller twin mount so the weight savings could be freed up for increased armour protection. The turret and ammunition-handling facilities incorporated many anti-flash measures and interlocks, improving safety but adding to complexity. Revolving weight of mountings: quadruple Mk III 1,582 tons, twin Mk II 915 tons.

In service, the quad turrets proved to be less reliable than was hoped for. Wartime haste in building, insufficient clearance between the rotating and fixed structure of the turret, insufficient full calibre firing exercises and extensive arrangements to prevent flash from reaching the magazines led to problems during prolonged actions. In order to bring ammunition into the turret at any degree of train, the design included a transfer ring between the magazine and turret; this did not have sufficient clearance to allow for the ship bending and flexing. These defects were addressed, and improved clearances, improved mechanical linkages, and better training led to greater reliability in the quadruple turrets but they remained controversial.

Performance

On entering operational service the turrets gained an initial reputation for unreliability, with individual guns and entire turrets jamming in action.

During the battle against Bismarck, a close-range hit from a 14-inch shell fired by King George V or a 16-inch shell fired by Rodney penetrated the -thick armour of the barbette of Bismarck's 'B' turret, causing an internal explosion which blew the rear face of the turret away. Underwater survey also shows that the  vertical armour of the conning tower of Bismarck was penetrated by 14-inch shells In the Battle of North Cape, Duke of York fired 52 broadsides; of these 31 straddled the Scharnhorst, a fast and actively manoeuvring target, and a further 16 fell within 200 yards – an excellent performance, even when radar-control is taken into account. The effects of the 14-inch shellfire on Scharnhorst quickly degraded her fighting abilities: Duke of Yorks first salvo put 'A' turret out of action; 'B' turret soon followed; a subsequent hit penetrated the German ship's armour, detonating in one of the boiler rooms and reducing the vessel's speed. This reduction in speed meant that the Scharnhorst could not escape pursuit, and was responsible for her eventual destruction.

By being instrumental in the destruction of two modern enemy battleships, the 14-inch Mark VII gun was, arguably, one of the most successful battleship main armaments of World War II.

Coastal guns

In World War II two guns, nicknamed Winnie and Pooh, were  mounted as coastal artillery near Dover to engage German batteries across the Channel in occupied France.

Armour penetration
Penetration at a muzzle velocity of 2483 ft/s, guns with new linings or with no significant wear:
Belt
 @ 0 m (0yd)
 @ 
 @ 
 @ 
Decks
 @ 
 @ 
 @ 
 @ 
 @ 
Reproduced from Nav weapons.com

Surviving example

See also 
 List of naval guns

Notes

References 
 
 
 
Garzke, William H. Jr., Dulin, Robert O. Jr. and Webb, Thomas G. (1994) Bismarck's Final Battle, Warship International No. 2. Available as a web version at NavWeaps.com 
Kaplan, P. (2014) World War Two at Sea: The Last Battleships, Pen and Sword Books, Barnsley. 
 
 Page from Nav weapons.com
http://navweaps.com/index_nathan/Penetration_index.php

External links

 Video : "Winnie" firing, Dover, 1941
 Movie clip of RN 14" gun loading and firing procedure (NOTE : external sequences are of different guns)

 

Naval guns of the United Kingdom
World War II naval weapons of the United Kingdom
356 mm artillery
Coastal artillery
 Military equipment introduced in the 1940s